The 1st Minnesota Territorial Legislature first convened on September 3, 1849. The 9 members of the Minnesota Territorial Council and the 18 members of the Minnesota House of Representatives were elected during the General Election of August 1, 1849.

Sessions 
The territorial legislature met in a regular session from September 3, 1849, to November 1, 1849. There were no special sessions of the first territorial legislature.

Party summary

Council

House of Representatives

Leadership 
President of the Council
David Olmsted (D-Long Prairie)

Speaker of the House
Joseph W. Furber (W-Cottage Grove)

Members

Council

House of Representatives

Notes

References 

 Minnesota Legislators Past & Present - Session Search Results (Session 0.1, Senate)
 Minnesota Legislators Past & Present - Session Search Results (Session 0.1, House)

00.1st
1840s in Minnesota Territory